Casuaria is a genus of snout moths. It was described by Francis Walker in 1866 and is known from Brazil.

Species
 Casuaria armata Walker, 1866
 Casuaria catocalis (Ragonot, 1891)
 Casuaria crumena (C. Felder, R. Felder & Rogenhofer, 1875)
 Casuaria excissimalis (Dyar, 1923)

References

Chrysauginae
Pyralidae genera